The Toyota AZ engine family is a straight-4 piston engine series. The AZ series uses an aluminium engine block with cast iron cylinder liners and aluminium DOHC cylinder head. The engine series features many advanced technologies including slant-squish combustion chambers, offset cylinder and crank centers, and the VVT-i continuously variable intake valve timing system.

The cylinder block is an open-deck, midi-skirt die-cast aluminium type with cast-in iron liners and a die-cast aluminium lower crankcase and a stamped oil pan. The forged steel crankshaft is fully balanced with eight counterweights and supported by five main bearings. A helical gear pressed in No. 3 counterweight drives twin contra-rotating balance shafts in the shaft housing within the lower crankcase.

The dual overhead camshafts are driven by a single-stage roller chain of  pitch, enabling a narrow included valve angle of 27.5°. The camshafts act on four valves per cylinder via bucket tappets. As in the recent Toyota engine practice, no clearance adjusting shim is employed. The four-vane VVT-i device is fitted on the intake camshaft, altering timing by 50°. The valve cover is made of magnesium to save weight.

Fuel is injected sequentially via an ultra-fine-atomization injector with twelve small injection holes, each  in diameter. As in the smaller NZ engine, the new AZ adopts a plastic, built-up, and vibration-welded intake manifold integrating a large volume plenum chamber ( volume including a  resonator). Exhaust manifolds are of tubular construction with integrated catalytic converters.

The AZ is the replacement for the S engine. Its successor is the AR engine.

Excessive oil consumption
The 2AZ-FE engine in the 2007-2009 Camry and 2006-2009 Rav4 may burn excessive oil and is involved in this lawsuit. Other engines are also affected. There are approximately 1,715,200 vehicles covered by this Warranty Enhancement Program.

1AZ
The 1AZ line of engines have  displacements.

1AZ-FE
The 1AZ-FE is a  version.

 2002-2006 Toyota Camry (Southeast Asian/Taiwanese version)
 2006–2009 Toyota Camry (Aurion version)
 2000–2003 Toyota RAV4
 2003-2006 Toyota RAV4 Euro
 2001–2009 Toyota Ipsum
 2004–2008 Toyota Wish (Southeast Asian/Taiwanese version)

1AZ-FSE
The 1AZ-FSE is a  version. The 1AZ-FSE features Toyota's D-4 direct injection system.

 Toyota Avensis
 Toyota Avensis Verso
 Toyota Noah/Voxy
 Toyota RAV4
 Toyota Gaia
 Toyota Isis
 Toyota Ipsum
 Toyota Caldina
 Toyota Wish
 Toyota Nadia
 Toyota Allion
 Toyota Premio
 Toyota Opa

2AZ
The 2AZ line of engines have  displacements.

2AZ-FE

Later versions of the 2AZ-FE engine were upgraded with 9.8:1 compression ratio, a slightly more aggressive intake cam profile, 6500 rpm redline, and piston oil squirters.

Japan-made Toyota vehicles with the 2AZ-FE engine were equipped with the K112 transmission also referred to as 7-speed Super CVT-i automatic (Seven-speed Sequential Shiftmatic) from October 2005.

However, these later 2AZ-FE models were the first to be rated under the new SAE J1349 standard. The new standard usually produces more conservative numbers, though no definitive comparison is available since the two versions were never tested by the same standard. The RAV4 uses a different timing chain cover from the Camry, they can however be interchanged.

A TRD supercharger was available for the Scion tC until Spring 2009.

There have been complaints of this engine "burning oil" in North America, with the issue starting after , though mostly after . Piston ring design has been identified as a potential problem. Toyota has issued a TSB (Technical service bulletin) TSB #0094-11 in August 2011 but has not issued a recall. Alternative theories point to a head gasket problem: the 2AZ-FE aluminum block threads may wear out on the back three middle bolts (closest to firewall). Check TSB SB-0015-11.

There are several class-action lawsuits underway regarding this issue. In January 2015, Toyota North America issued extended warranty notification (ZE7) for this issue for Toyota North America vehicles only.

 2002–2009 Toyota Camry
 2009–2011 Toyota Matrix S (USA)/XR (Canada)/XRS
 2009–2010 Pontiac Vibe
 2009–2010 Toyota Corolla XRS (2011-2013 only in Mexico and in Canada)
 2002–2008 Toyota Camry Solara
 2004–2012 Toyota RAV4
 2000–2007 Toyota Highlander/Kluger
 2000−2013 Toyota Harrier
 2000-2019 Toyota Estima /  Toyota Previa / Toyota Tarago
 2001-2010 Toyota Ipsum
 2002−2015 Toyota Alphard
 2008−2015 Toyota Vellfire
 2006−2012 Toyota Blade
 2003-2009 Toyota Avensis
 2005–2010 Scion tC
 2008–2015 Scion xB
 2007-2013 Toyota Mark X ZiO

2AZ-FSE
The 2AZ-FSE is a  version. The 2AZ-FSE features Toyota's D-4 direct injection system.

 Toyota Avensis

2AZ-FXE
The 2AZ-FXE is an Atkinson cycle variant of the 2AZ-FE. It has the same bore and stroke, but the intake cam and pistons are unique. It has a physical compression ratio of 12.5:1.

The large valve overlap leads to a reduction in cylinder charge and reduced torque and power output, but efficiency is increased. This combination makes the 2AZ-FXE suitable for use only in hybrid vehicles, where peak torque and power demands can be met by the electric motor and battery.

 2003–2014 Toyota Alphard Hybrid
 Toyota Estima Hybrid
 2007–2011 Toyota Camry Hybrid AHV40
 2010–2014 Lexus HS 250h
 2009– Toyota Sai

See also

 List of Toyota engines

References

AZ
Straight-four engines
Gasoline engines by model